Robert Campbell Moberly (26 July 1845 – 8 June 1903) was an English theologian and the first principal of St Stephen's House, Oxford (1876–1878).

Life
He was the son of George Moberly, Bishop of Salisbury, and faithfully maintained the traditions of his father's teaching. His sister was the writer Charlotte Anne Moberly. Educated at Twyford School, Winchester and New College, Oxford, he was appointed senior student of Christ Church in 1867 and tutor in 1869. In 1876 he went out with Bishop Copleston to Ceylon for six months.

After his return, he became the first head of St Stephen's House, Oxford (1876–1878), and then, after presiding for two years over the Theological College at Salisbury, where he acted as his father's chaplain, he accepted the college living of Great Budworth in Cheshire in 1880, and the same year married Alice, the daughter of his father's predecessor, Walter Kerr Hamilton. In 1892, Lord Salisbury made him Regius Professor of Pastoral Theology at the University of Oxford and a canon of Christ Church Cathedral in that city. He was appointed an honorary chaplain to Queen Victoria in July 1898, and in early January 1901 was appointed Chaplain-in-Ordinary to Her Majesty. The Queen died later that month, and Moberly was re-appointed Chaplain-in-Ordinary to her successor, King Edward VII.

After a long period of delicate health he died at Christ Church. He was the father of Walter Hamilton Moberly and Robert Hamilton Moberly.

Works
His chief writings were:
1889: "The Incarnation as the Basis of Dogma", an essay in Lux Mundi
1891: Belief in a Personal God, a paper
1896: Reason and Religion, a protest against the limitation of the reason to the understanding
1897: Ministerial Priesthood
1901: Atonement and Personality. In this last work, by which he is chiefly known, he aimed at presenting an explanation and a vindication of the doctrine of the atonement by the help of the conception of personality. Rejecting the retributive view of punishment, he describes the sufferings of Christ as those of the perfect "Penitent", and finds their expiatory value to lie in the Person of the Sufferer, the God-Man.
 Undenominationalism (1902)

References

External links
 
Bibliographic directory from Project Canterbury

1903 deaths
1845 births
English theologians
People educated at Winchester College
Regius Professors of Moral and Pastoral Theology
Alumni of New College, Oxford
People educated at Twyford School
Principals of St Stephen's House, Oxford

19th-century Anglican theologians
20th-century Anglican theologians